Edward Stephen Hutchinson (born 23 February 1982) is an English retired professional footballer who made over 110 appearances in the Football League for Brentford. He was a combative, energetic central midfield player.

Career

Brentford 

Hutchinson started out at non-League Sutton United, before leaving to join Brentford as an 18-year-old. The player spent six years at Griffin Park, clocking up in excess of a century of league appearances. Hutchinson was not a regular scorer during his time at Brentford, but did score in a fifth-round FA Cup replay against Premier League Southampton in March 2005. Despite opening the scoring, Brentford went on to lose the match 3–1.

Oxford United 
Upon being released by Brentford, the player attracted interest from various clubs. Hutchinson ultimately signed up with Oxford United, spending three years at the Kassam Stadium. Whilst at Oxford, Hutchinson made 72 league appearances, thirty of which were from the substitutes bench. The midfielder fell out of the favour during his last season at Oxford, being placed on the transfer list midway through the campaign. Hutchinson was also inadvertently embroiled in controversy during his final season at Oxford. The club were deducted five points for playing Hutchinson although the player had not been adequately registered.

Non-league football 
Upon leaving Oxford United, Hutchinson signed for Crawley Town. He was a mainstay in the first-team throughout his first season at Crawley, appearing in 39 league games, scoring his first goal for the Red Devils on only his second appearance for the club against Forest Green Rovers.

He joined Eastbourne Borough on 1 January 2011, moving to Havant & Waterlooville just over a year later in February 2012. In the summer of 2014, Hutchinson joined Maidenhead United, staying for one season before moving to Hampton & Richmond Borough. He won the Isthmian League Premier Division title in his only season with the 'Beavers'.

Personal life 
He is the twin brother of Kingstonian centre back Tom Hutchinson.

Career statistics

Honours
Hampton & Richmond Borough

Isthmian League Premier Division: 2015–16

References

External links

1982 births
Living people
British identical twins
People from Surrey
English footballers
English Football League players
National League (English football) players
Isthmian League players
Sutton United F.C. players
Oxford United F.C. players
Brentford F.C. players
Crawley Town F.C. players
Eastbourne Borough F.C. players
Havant & Waterlooville F.C. players
Maidenhead United F.C. players
Hampton & Richmond Borough F.C. players
Twin sportspeople
English twins
Association football midfielders